Coleophora serinipennella is a moth of the family Coleophoridae. It is found in southern Europe, North Africa, the Near East, the eastern Palearctic realm (including Japan), as well as in Australia in south-western Queensland, South Australia and arid areas of Western Australia south of Carnarvon.

Adults are on wing from June to August.

The larvae feed on Atriplex, Halimione and Chenopodium species. They make galls in the stems of their host plant. The galls are large, oval or elongated. They are not always constant in shape.

References

External links
Australian Faunal Directory
Japanese Moths

serinipennella
Moths of Australia
Moths of Europe
Moths of Africa
Moths of Asia
Moths described in 1872